Michael Jackson's Vision is a deluxe DVD video album by American recording artist Michael Jackson. It was released on November 22, 2010 by Epic Records, Legacy Recordings, and Jackson's own label, MJJ Productions. It includes three DVDs, featuring 4.5 hours of content of 42 music videos with newly restored color and remastered audio. Jackson referred to each of these productions as a "short film" and not a music video. This is the first time that all of Jackson's videos have been released on DVD. According to a statement by the producers, the video recognizes Jackson's "pioneering short films that transformed the entertainment industry with timeless, pop culture classics".

Disc one features videos from the albums Off the Wall, Thriller and Bad and disc two features videos from the albums Dangerous, HIStory: Past, Present and Future, Book I, Blood on the Dance Floor: HIStory in the Mix and Invincible. The third disc, which is a bonus disc, features seven videos. Michael Jackson's Vision includes the full-length versions of the John Landis-directed "Thriller" and "Black or White" as well as the classic "Bad" directed by Academy Award-winning filmmaker Martin Scorsese. Also included in the boxed set are Jackson's collaborations with other noted film directors such as John Singleton, Spike Lee and David Fincher as well as "Ghosts," his rarely seen collaboration with special effects legend Stan Winston. Michael Jackson's Vision is available in a limited edition boxed set featuring a 60-page glossy hard-bound book that includes behind-the-scenes photos from Jackson's videos, which includes information for each video including: songwriter, album, director, production date, location and photography.

Ten music videos previously unavailable on DVD including "One More Chance" are included. It was also released on the iTunes Store and has iTunes LP features. The videos "Smooth Criminal", "Speed Demon", "Come Together", and "Leave Me Alone" come from Jackson's 1988 film Moonwalker. The "Smooth Criminal" segment is actually over 40 minutes long but only the 10-minute song and dance scene is featured. The video "Another Part of Me" is from Jackson's Bad World Tour and "Will You Be There" is from the Dangerous World Tour.

The "HIStory" video and the complete version of "Ghosts" are the only short film that is not included in this box set. The original music video of "Blood on the Dance Floor" is replaced with the Refugee Camp Mix for unknown reasons. The videos for The Jacksons' songs "Torture" and "Body" are also not included, because Michael did not appear in any of them, despite having a verse in each of them. Also not included is the music video for The Jacksons' "2300 Jackson Street".

On February 15, 2011, Michael Jackson's Vision was certified 5× Platinum by RIAA for the sales of over 0.5 million units in the United States. On December 31, 2010, it was also certified Diamond in France (for the sales of over 60 000 units) and 2× Platinum in Australia. On May 29, 2011, it was also certified Gold in New Zealand. It has been also certified Gold in Austria and Platinum in Poland.

Reception over the video and audio quality of the box set has been mixed. As the videos are played in 16:9, videos with a 4:3 aspect ratio are pillarboxed and as a result, the resolution is lower than some previous DVDs. Also, the audio is mixed in PCM stereo instead of 5.1 Surround as in many previous DVDs.

Intros
Michael Jackson's Vision is the second Jackson DVD to feature animation intros to all of the videos (the other being HIStory on Film). For discs one and two, before each video begins, a short introduction, which features a short animated clip of the video, is shown revealing the title. The bonus disc just reveals the title and a clip is not shown.

"Don't Stop Til You Get Enough" shows Michael dancing on a blue backdrop with a white glow and a light up disco floor. "Rock with You" has a dancing Michael in front of a green light so he is a silhouette. "She's Out Of My Life" shows Michael on a stool. "Billie Jean" has Michael magically appear and toestand on the light up sidewalk. "Beat It" has the Beat It jacket unzip to reveal Michael dancing On concrete. "Thriller" shows a zombie coming out of a grave. "Bad" has a buckle being undone to reveal Michael in the subway. "The Way You Make Me Feel" shows Michael's silhouette on a brick wall. "Man In The Mirror" shows a mirror. "Dirty Diana" shows a crowd. "Smooth Criminal" shows Michael doing the lean in a spotlight. "Another Part Of Me" shows a crowd. "Speed Demon" shows Spike (the rabbit) dancing. "Come Together" shows a crowd. "Leave Me Alone" shows news papers floating up over the roof to reveal Michael on his roller coaster. "Liberian Girl" shows director chairs. "Black Or White" shows multiple historical places mashed together. "Remember The Time" shows ancient Egypt. "In The Closet" shows a desert. "Jam" shows Michael's silhouette dancing. "Heal The World" shows candles. "Give In To Me" shows a crowd covered in electricity. "Who Is It" shows Michael looking out the skyscraper's window. "Will You Be There" shows a crowd. "Gone Too Soon" shows rose petals. "Scream" shows Michael floating. "Childhood" shows the moon behind trees. "You Are Not Alone" shows a slow motion wave. "Earth Song" shows the world. "They Don't Care About Us" shows Michael Jackson in front of Brazilian flags. "Stranger In Moscow" shows slow motion rain. "Blood On The Dance Floor" shows Michael smashing glasses on the ground. "Ghosts" shows the set of the film with lightning outside. "You Rock My World" shows Michael's silhouette from where he starts singing, and finally "Cry" shows paper cutouts of people holding hands.

DVD Menu
Play All - Plays all the videos in order.
Short Films - The list of all the videos.
Random Mix - Plays all the videos in shuffle mode.
Resume - Continues on the video you left off.

Track listings

Alterations
Some music videos have been changed and are different from their previous commercial releases.

 "Billie Jean" – unwanted specks such as a lightning bolt that pops up by Jacksons's feet during the dancing scene have been cleaned up.
 "Bad" – the full 18-minute version with the ending credits included.
 "The Way You Make Me Feel" – this is the 9-minute version; grunts and extra noises made by Jackson can be heard.
 "Smooth Criminal" – this is the 9-minute version as shown on HIStory on Film, Volume II, which in turns was based on the “dance sequence” from the Smooth Criminal segment of Moonwalker.
 "Speed Demon" – lines at the bottom of the screen that look as if they are from a VHS are briefly seen at the end.
 "Black or White" – the original version without the racist graffiti added on to the car windows and shop door is featured but it does not include the "prejudice is ignorance" title card.
 "Jam" – the "hoo" sound before Michael Jordan passes the ball to Michael Jackson is not heard.
 "Heal the World" – has an added intro that can be seen on Dangerous – The Short Films.
 "Who Is It" – has some parts of the instrumental rearranged compared to its previous release.
 "Will You Be There" – the video is not the one on Michael Jackson's YouTube page. It is an alternate version of the one in Dangerous – The Short Films; a few seconds of the audio at the beginning is missing, and the ending is different from the one previously released, as there is no angel flying down to Jackson; instead, he sings on his own, and slow motion shots of the audience are shown.
 "Gone Too Soon" – is the version found on Michael Jackson's YouTube page and not the one previously released as seen on Dangerous – The Short Films.
 "Scream" – is the version with the word "fucking" and Janet's middle finger uncensored.
 "You Are Not Alone" – is the version without Jackson naked with angel wings on his back.
 "Earth Song" – most of the sound effects are muted and the ending message is not shown.
 "Blood on the Dance Floor" – the original version of the music video is replaced with the Refugee Camp Remix, as shown on HIStory on Film, Volume II.
 "Ghosts" – is the trimmed-down 3½-minute long edit of the movie of the same name.
 "You Rock My World" – full 13-minute version is featured along with original credits.
 "Can You Feel It" – includes the ending credits.
 "They Don't Care About Us (Prison Version)" – has a disclaimer at the beginning, plus different scenes than those of the first broadcast on TV.

Charts

Certifications

References

2010 video albums
Michael Jackson video albums